Yusefabad-e Tudak (also Romanized as Yūsefābād-e Tūdak) is a village in Taftan-e Jonubi Rural District, Nukabad District, Khash County, Sistan and Baluchestan Province, Iran. At the 2006 census, its population was 19, in 5 families.

References 

Populated places in Khash County